Julie-Marie Strange, FAcSS (born 1973) is a historian. Since 2019, she has been Professor of Modern British History at Durham University.

Career 
Born in 1973, Strange completed a Bachelor of Arts degree and a Master of Philosophy degree at the University of Wales, Cardiff. From 1996 to 2000, she carried out doctoral studies at the University of Liverpool under the supervision of Andrew Davies and Jon Lawrence; she was awarded a PhD in 2000 for her thesis on death and mourning in the British working classes during the late Victorian and Edwardian periods.

After working as a research assistant on the archives of the United Africa Company and (for two years) as a lecturer at Birkbeck, University of London, she joined the Department of History at the University of Manchester in 2003. She was eventually promoted to be Professor of British History. In 2019, she moved to Durham University to be Professor of Modern British History.

Strange was elected a fellow of the Academy of Social Sciences in 2019; the citation called her "a leading figure in framing historically-informed research questions around issues of the marketplace and accountability in humanitarian discourse and practice".

Bibliography 
Books

Thesis

Peer-reviewed articles and chapters

References 

1973 births
Living people
British historians
Alumni of Cardiff University
Alumni of the University of Liverpool
Academics of the University of Manchester
Academics of Durham University
Fellows of the Academy of Social Sciences